Glenn Simpson "Keeper" McWhinney (August 10, 1930 – April 14, 2012) was a Canadian football player who played for the Edmonton Eskimos and Winnipeg Blue Bombers. He won the Grey Cup with the Eskimos in 1954. McWhinney's football career was ended in 1956 when he sustained a broken neck. He later joined the Blue Bombers as a scout from 1956 to 1958. McWhinney also played basketball in the Winnipeg Men's Senior League. He died in 2012; a park in Winnipeg is named after him.

McWhinney's son Jeff serves as the current keeper of the Grey Cup trophy.

References

1930 births
2012 deaths
Edmonton Elks players
Players of Canadian football from Manitoba
Canadian football people from Winnipeg